Salcea is a town in Suceava County, in the Western Moldavia region of northern Romania, with a population of 9,015. It administers four villages: Mereni, Plopeni, Prelipca, and Văratec. Salcea was declared a town in 2004.

The town is located at about 11 kilometers east of Suceava and it is best known for the Suceava Airport located nearby.

Administration and local politics

Town council 

The town's current local council has the following political composition, according to the results of the 2020 Romanian local elections:

Notes

External links

  Salcea Town Hall official site
  Suceava Airport official site
  Suceava County site – Salcea web page

Towns in Romania
Populated places in Suceava County
Localities in Western Moldavia